The Vienna coup is an unblocking technique in contract bridge made in preparation for a squeeze play.  It is so named because it was originally published by James Clay (1804-1873) after observing it being executed in the days of whist by "the greatest player in Vienna" — identity unknown.

Examples
 On the play of the A by South, East is squeezed but can escape by throwing a small heart.  Although the Q is now set up, South must next play either the Q, 2 or 4 to be won in dummy and has no entry back to cash it; he must now lose a spade to East.

 However, if instead, South plays the 2 to the A, East is squeezed when declarer next leads the 2 to the ace.

 In this layout there is no way to get back to the hand by playing the 2 to the ace. In this case, the A must have been cashed already at an earlier stage to squeeze East when declarer leads the A and discards the 2 from the table.

References

Contract bridge coups